The 1978 Washington Huskies football team was an American football team that represented the University of Washington during the 1978 NCAA Division I-A football season.  Under fourth-year head coach Don James, the team compiled a 7–4 record, tied for second in the Pacific-10 Conference, and outscored its opponents 270 to 155.  Linebacker Michael Jackson was selected as the team's most valuable player. The team captains were Jackson, Nesby Glasgow, Scott Greenwood, 

In the newly-expanded Pac-10, the defending champion Huskies returned eighteen starters, but not at quarterback. Washington defeated the two new members, Arizona and Arizona State, and did not play California. The two losses were to UCLA and USC, and the Huskies defeated Washington State in the Apple Cup for the fifth 

An unexpected non-conference loss at unranked Indiana in September likely kept Washington out of a bowl game.

Schedule

Roster

Season summary

UCLA

Kansas

at Indiana

at Oregon State

Alabama

at Stanford

Oregon

Arizona State

Arizona

at USC

at Washington State

NFL Draft selections
Five University of Washington Huskies were selected in the 1979 NFL Draft, which lasted twelve rounds with 330 selections.

References

External links
 Official game program: Washington vs. Washington State at Spokane – November 25, 1978

Washington
Washington Huskies football seasons
Washington Huskies football